Biogenesis is the generation of life from existing life.

Biogenesis may also refer to:
 "Biogenesis" (The X-Files)
 Biogenesis baseball scandal (involving MLB players taking growth-hormone)
 Mitochondrial biogenesis
 Organelle biogenesis
 Ribosome biogenesis
 Recapitulation theory, the biogenetic law of Ernst Haeckel

See also
 Abiogenesis, the generation of life from non-living matter
 Biomolecule
 Organic chemistry